Offshore wind power is in the early stages of development in the United States. In 2016, the United States Department of Energy estimated that the country has a gross resource potential of 10,800GW of offshore wind capacity, with a "technical" resource potential of 2,058GW. Offshore wind projects are under development in wind-rich areas of the East Coast, Great Lakes, and Pacific coast. The first commercial offshore wind farm, Block Island Wind Farm, began operation in 2016. As of 2017, about 30 projects totaling 24 gigawatts (GW) of potential installed capacity were being planned.

In 2021 the Biden Administration announced a target of 30 GW of offshore wind by 2030; the US currently has 0.042 GW of offshore wind power.

Federal regulation and incentives

The construction of an offshore wind farm involves a three-phase permitting process.  First, the proponents must lease the seafloor from its owner – typically this will be Outer Continental Shelf, the federal seafloor which is leased by the Bureau of Ocean Energy Management (BOEM) under the Outer Continental Shelf Lands Act — but small wind projects can be constructed in state waters as well.  The BOEM is the federal agency responsible for determining offshore areas where wind farms may be built in federal waters. It sells leases to qualified bidders. These leases may be awarded non-competitively, if only one proponent is interested in developing the area, or by auction.  Once awarded, the lease areas can be further assigned and subdivided into separate projects.

Each project proponent, after winning an auction and making its initial lease payment, must file a Site Assessment Plan (SAP), which details the work required to evaluate the environmental conditions in the lease area, including both surface and seafloor conditions.  After the SAP is approved, the proponent will install weather buoys and engage survey vessels to develop sufficiently detailed information to complete the design of the wind farm – this will include identifying protected species habitats, unexploded ordnance, shipwrecks, and geological formations that could interfere with either the foundations for wind turbines or the electrical cabling.  After completing the survey, the proponent might choose to abandon the lease area if it appears development will be uneconomical, or else continue to final design and permitting, which culminates in the filing of a Construction and Operations Plan (COP).

In addition to the federal permitting process, all wind farms require state permits for their connections to the on-shore electric grid; even if an offshore project is constructed entirely in federal waters its "export cables" will need to transit state waters to reach the shore. Other permits may be required to connect to the grid, such as certificate of public necessity, as well as private consents from an integrated electric utility or a regional transmission organization.

Wind Energy Areas
In January 2012, a "Smart for the Start" regulatory approach was introduced, designed to expedite the siting process while incorporating strong environmental protections. Specifically, the Department of Interior approved "wind energy areas" off the coast where projects can move through the regulatory approval process more quickly.
The NOAA Coastal Services Center (CSC) has released a cadastre web tool to illustrate suitability of Eastern seaboard areas.

National Environmental Policy Act
Like other major permitting actions, approval of the construction and operations plan is subject to the National Environmental Policy Act and requires preparation of an environmental impact statement (EIS).  The BOEM is the lead federal agency in the EIS process, coordinating input from other federal agencies including the Coast Guard, the Fish and Wildlife Service, the Maritime Administration, the National Park Service, and the Army Corps of Engineers. In addition to approving each individual project's COP, the BOEM also performs an environmental review prior to opening an area of seafloor to leasing, although this review is not as stringent as a full EIS. The initial review largely serves to identify areas which are not developable and thus should be excluded from leasing.

The full COP review considers impacts to protected marine ecosystems, commercial and recreational fishing, as well as historic and cultural resources. The Coast Guard and Federal Aviation Administration evaluate each wind farm's COP for hazards to navigation and interference with coastal surveillance radars.

Jones Act
The Merchant Marine Act of 1920 is a United States federal statute that provides for the promotion and maintenance of the American merchant marine. Section 27 of the Merchant Marine Act is known as the Jones Act and deals with cabotage (coastwise trade) and requires that all goods transported by water between U.S. ports be carried on U.S.-flag ships, constructed in the United States, owned by U.S. citizens, and crewed by U.S. citizens and U.S. permanent residents.

The lack of ships of size needed to transport large equipment needed for wind turbines has slowed the develop of offshore wind farms. To comply with the Jones Act wind turbine installation vessels for $300 million could economically supply a schedule of 4 GW projects over 10 years. Two or three US yards have the capacity to build such vessels. The Charybdis vessel is under construction in Texas, scheduled for 2023.

Tax incentives
In December 2020, Congress approved a 30% investment tax credit for US offshore wind farms.

MARAD grants
The United States Maritime Administration (MARAD) has made grants for various projects to re-fit or develop new offshore wind ports for the assembly and staging of turbines and other windfarm infrastructure.

Wind ports and infrastructure
Several ports are building or converting facilities to handle the large components and manufacturing facilities such as a blade factories are planned.

Portsmouth Marine Terminal (VA), Port of Baltimore (MD), New Jersey Wind Port, Port of Paulsboro (NJ), Arthur Kill Terminal (NY), South Brooklyn Marine Terminal (NY), Port of Albany–Rensselaer (NY), Bridgeport Harbor (CT), State Pier New London (CT) New Bedford Marine Commerce Terminal (MA), and Salem Harbor (MA) have all been identified as potential offshore wind ports which would support the manufacture of components and staging areas for off-shore wind farms and docking of heavy-lift ships.

In 2019, the University of Delaware and the Danish Energy and Climate Academy jointly opened the first US skills training program for offshore wind energy professionals.

Experimental floating turbine projects
North America's first floating wind turbine was the 20 kW Volturn US, which was lowered into the Penobscot River in Maine in 2013. It is a University of Maine project.

In May 2014, the United States Department of Energy chose an offshore wind projects to receive funding. Principle Power was planning a 30-MW WindFloat project in 2013 using 6-MW Siemens turbines in 366 m of water near Coos Bay, Oregon to be operational in 2017, but the project was cancelled as too costly. Interest has been renewed.

As of 2020, the United States Department of Energy is funding two demonstration projects: University of Maine's Aqua Ventus I, which plans to use a semisubmersible floating concrete foundation design and Lake Erie Energy Development Corporation's (LEEDCo's) 20 MW Icebreaker project

In 2021 the Biden administration approved large areas off the coast California for development of wind farms with floating turbines.

List

See also

Anbaric Development Partners
Atlantic Wind Connection
Wind power in the United States
List of wind farms
List of offshore wind farms
Lists of offshore wind farms by country
Wind Power
NIMBY
Energy Policy Act of 2005

Notes

External links
 List of U.S. offshore wind projects
 'Only a matter of time': U.S. offshore wind struggles to get off the ground
 Draft Environmental Impact Statement – produced by the US Army Corps of Engineers
 Opinion piece on wind turbines shifting
 Cape Wind Project Page – company website
 Clean Power Now – a pro-project advocacy group
 Alliance to Protect Nantucket Sound – anti-project advocacy group
 Northeast Ocean Data: Offshore Wind Projects

Wind power in the United States